The House of Plantagenet was the first truly armigerous royal dynasty of England. Their predecessor, Henry I of England, had presented items decorated with a lion heraldic emblem to his son-in-law, Plantagenet founder Geoffrey, Count of Anjou, and his family experimented with different lion-bearing coats until these coalesced during the reign of his grandson, Richard I (1189–1199), into a coat of arms with three lions on a red field, formally Gules, three lions passant guardant or (armed and langued azure), that became the Royal Arms of England, and colloquially those of England itself. The various cadet branches descended from this family bore differenced versions of these arms, while later members of the House of Plantagenet would either quarter or impale these arms with others to reflect their political aspirations.

Overview of Plantagenet arms

Before Edward III

After Edward III

House of Lancaster

House of York

Non-Plantagenet families
The heiresses of Norfolk and Kent transmitted the Plantagenet arms to non-Plantagenet families:

Henry VI of England granted differenced versions of the Plantagenet arms to his maternal half-brothers. This was an extraordinary grant, since they were not descended from the English royal family.

House of Plantagenet

Descendants of Geoffrey Plantagenet, Count of Anjou

Descendants of John, King of England

Descendants of Henry III of England

Descendants of Edward I of England

Descendants of Edward II of England

Descendants of Edward III of England

Descendants of Edward, the Black Prince

Descendants of Lionel of Antwerp, 1st Duke of Clarence

John of Gaunt, 1st Duke of Lancaster

Edmund of Langley, 1st Duke of York

Descendants of Thomas of Woodstock, 1st Duke of Gloucester

House of Lancaster

Descendants of John of Gaunt, 1st Duke of Lancaster

Descendants of Henry IV of England

Descendants of Henry V of England

House of York

Descendants of Edmund of Langley, 1st Duke of York

Descendants of Richard of York, 3rd Duke of York

Descendants of Edward IV of England

Descendants of George Plantagenet, 1st Duke of Clarence

Descendants of Richard III of England

House of Beaufort

Descendants of John Beaufort, 1st Earl of Somerset

Descendants of Henry Beaufort, 3rd Duke of Somerset

See also

 Royal arms of England
 House of Plantagenet
 Issue of Edward III of England
 House of Lancaster
 House of York
 House of Beaufort
 War of the Roses

References
Citations

Bibliography
 

 
 .
 
 
 
 
 
 
 

Plantagenet
Plantagenet